Josip Mišić (born 14 July 1986 in SR Croatia) is a Croatian footballer currently playing for Sloga Jaruge.

External links
 

1986 births
Living people
Association football fullbacks
Croatian footballers
Croatia under-21 international footballers
NK Osijek players
NK Bjelovar players
NK Kamen Ingrad players
NK Međimurje players
FC U Craiova 1948 players
NK Vinogradar players
Croatian Football League players
First Football League (Croatia) players
Liga I players
Croatian expatriate footballers
Expatriate footballers in Romania
Croatian expatriate sportspeople in Romania